Telstar 18V (Telstar 18 Vantage / APStar 5C) is a communication satellite in the Telstar series of the Canadian satellite communications company Telesat. T18V will be equipped with C and Ku-band transponders and operate from 138° East. At , it is the second-heaviest communication satellite ever launched, weighing slightly less than its sibling Telstar 19V.

Launch
Telstar 18V was launched on a SpaceX Falcon 9 Block 5 rocket from Space Launch Complex 40 (SLC40) at Cape Canaveral Air Force Station, Space Coast, Florida, United States, on September 10, 2018, at 12:45 AM EDT (4:45 UTC). It was deployed into a subsynchronous transfer orbit (lower than the typical geostationary transfer orbit (GTO)) approximately 32 minutes after rocket's liftoff.

References

Telstar satellites
Spacecraft launched in 2018
2018 in Canada
Satellites using the SSL 1300 bus
SpaceX commercial payloads
Communications satellites in geostationary orbit